The Punjab Masstransit Authority (or PMA) is a public transportation authority of the Punjab province in Pakistan. PMA operates in the province's urban centers namely Lahore, Multan and the twin cities of Islamabad and Rawalpindi.

Punjab Masstransit Authority is a statutory body established by the Government of the Punjab which plans, constructs, maintains and operates the mass transit systems in the major cities of Punjab. Set up in 2012, the authority is tasked with providing safe, efficient and comfortable urban transportation systems in the province. It is headquartered from the 5th floor of the Arfa Software Technology Park on Ferozepur Road, Lahore.

Systems 
The PMA operates the following systems:

Orange Line Metro Train System Lahore 
Lahore Metrobus System
Lahore Feeder Routes
Multan Metrobus
Multan Feeder Routes
Pakistan Metrobus System (Rawalpindi-Islamabad)

Members 
The Authority consists of following members:

Chairperson 
Chief Minister of Punjab

Members 
Minister for Transport of the Government
Four members of Provincial Assembly of the Punjab including at least one female member of the Assembly and two members of National Assembly of Pakistan nominated by the Government
Three persons including at least one woman from the private sector nominated by the Government
Chairman, Lahore Transport Company
Chairman Planning and Development Board of the Government
Secretary to the Government, Finance Department
Secretary to the Government, Transport Department
Managing Director of the Authority
Secretary of the Authority

See also
Transport in Pakistan

References

Transport in Punjab, Pakistan
Government agencies of Punjab, Pakistan
2012 establishments in Pakistan